This is a complete list of appearances by members of the professional playing squad of UE Lleida during the 1991–92 season.

1992
Lleida
Lleida
Lleida